Big Fish is a musical with music and lyrics by Andrew Lippa and book by John August. It is based on Daniel Wallace's 1998 novel, Big Fish: A Novel of Mythic Proportions, and the 2003 film Big Fish written by John August and directed by Tim Burton.

Big Fish revolves around the relationship between Edward Bloom, a travelling salesman, and his adult son Will, who looks for what is behind his father's tall stories.

Background and concept
The story shifts between two timelines. In the present-day real world, sixty-year-old Edward Bloom faces his mortality while his son, Will, prepares to become a father himself. In the storybook past, Edward ages from a teenager, encountering a Witch, a Giant, a Mermaid, and the love of his life, Sandra. The stories meet as Will discovers the secret his father never revealed.

The musical plot differs from the 2003 film in certain aspects. The mythical town of Spectre — and Edward's quest to save it from destruction — has been folded into Edward's home town of Ashton. In the musical, The Witch and Jenny Hill are two distinct characters. In the film, Jenny Hill and The Witch were aspects of the same character played by Helena Bonham Carter. The character of Norther Winslow, played by Steve Buscemi in the film, doesn't exist in the musical, nor do conjoined twins Ping and Jing.

Plot
 Act 1
The curtain rises in Alabama on Edward Bloom, who is skipping rocks on the river. His son, Will, who is about to get married, comes to ask Edward not to make a toast or tell any of his crazy stories at the wedding. Edward cannot understand why Will feels this way, but assures Will that he will oblige. Entering a flashback to when Will was a child, Edward tells him a story. Edward is walking down the river when he meets a man trying to catch fish to no avail. So Edward teaches him that the proper way to catch fish is by doing the "Alabama Stomp", saying, "If you give a man a fish, you feed him for a day. Teach a man to fish, you feed him for a lifetime. Teach a man the Alabama Stomp, you feed his soul!" The entire company joins them, and they catch many, many fish. At the very end of the song, a giant fish jumps out of the water into the fisherman's arms ("Be the Hero"). When he finishes his story, Edward's wife, Sandra, tells them it's time for Will to go to bed. Edward refuses behind her back and tells Will another story of a witch that Edward met as a teenager, who showed Edward and his high school enemy, Don Price, how they would die ("The Witch").

The story returns to the present day, where Edward suspects that Will's fiancée, Josephine, is pregnant. He tells Will of his suspicion and, after jokingly pushing a response from Will, his suspicion is confirmed. But Will tells Edward that he cannot go around telling people because it is too soon and "statistically, it might not happen." At the wedding reception, Edward noisily decides to make a toast saying he has "recently decided to become a grandfather," and he has reason to believe that his wish "may come sooner than expected." Edward's toast angers Will and as Josephine takes the shocked crowd to catch the bouquet, Will and Edward argue. Will is angry that his father did not follow his requests, and Edward wishes to stop being treated like a child. After Sandra breaks up the argument before "one of [them] says something [they] can't take back," the reception ends. While leaving the celebration, Edward's doctor, one of the guests, notices that Edward seems to be in pain and suggests that he come in for an examination. At the hospital, Edward and Sandra discover that the cancer Edward has been fighting has spread beyond where they had thought. Though Edward has been hiding his cancer from Will, his doctor thinks he and Will should have a talk about it. Concurrently, in a hospital back where Will and Josephine live in New York City, they discover that their child is a boy ("Take Another Look"). Later that day, in Central Park, Will sings of the wonder and mystery of his future child, and promises to strengthen his relationship with his father, who he sees as a stranger ("Stranger"). Will's joy is interrupted by a phone call from his mother, telling him about Edward's condition and asking him and Josephine to come home.

In Edward and Sandra's shed in Alabama, Sandra tells Will that although he and Edward can be a handful, she loves them both ("Two Men in My Life"). They go to their backyard, and Josephine appears entertained by Edward's stories. She is enamored by his life and stories and wishes to hear them all, so he launches into another tale of his high school days. He was the hero of his small town, Ashton, and was the boyfriend of the head cheerleader, Jenny Hill ("Ashton's Favorite Son"). The town of Ashton, Alabama, is scared by a giant living in a nearby cave, so to get to the bottom of the situation, Edward volunteers to go talk to him. He has no fear because he knows he would not be killed by the giant. The Witch told him exactly how he would go, and this is not it. He goes to the cave and introduces himself to the giant, named Karl, and convinces him to join him on a journey away from Ashton ("Out There on the Road").

Back in the present, Josephine and Will are looking through Edward's old files. Josephine is excitedly talking about Edward's stories while Will expresses his concern that his father will die and he will not know who he is. Josephine suggests that if he makes a list of his father's stories and each of their morals, he will learn what kind of a person his father really is. He begins listing some of them, but is interrupted when Josephine finds a deed to a house in Ashton signed by Jenny Hill and Edward. She thinks this proves that Edward must be telling the truth, but Will denies it and questions why the deed exists in the first place. However, Josephine's interest sparks a conversation of Edward and Sandra's meeting. While Will believes they met in college, Josephine explains that is not what Edward told her. Will asks which version of the story she was told, and there is another flashback: Edward has taken Karl to try out for a circus. When they get there, three girls are auditioning with their song and dance routine ("Little Lamb from Alabama"). Edward notices one of the girls, Sandra, and it is love at first sight ("Time Stops"). He convinces the ringmaster, Amos Calloway, to hire Karl, and then agrees to work for the circus for free in exchange for one clue about Sandra each month ("Closer to Her"). After three years of working at the circus, Edward asks why he will not tell him her name, and Amos says that "secrets are the backbone of society." Later that night, Edward finds Amos in his true form: a werewolf. Upon learning Amos' big secret, Edward finally convinces him to tell him what he wants to know. Her name is Sandra Templeton, she goes to Auburn University, and she loves daffodils.

Edward travels over 700 miles by being shot from a cannon to Auburn University and finds Sandra only to discover that she is engaged to Don Price, Edward's high school rival. When Don sees Edward talking to Sandra, he beats him to the ground. Sandra breaks up with Don on the spot, and when Don asks, "You love this guy?" she responds, "Well he's just a stranger, but I prefer him to you." Edward proposes to Sandra, and though she is hesitant at first, he assures that they will love each other forever as he promises her a life full of daffodils ("Daffodils").

 Act 2
The show continues as Edward leads young Will and some other boys in a boy scouts troop to make a bonfire. He tells them the story of when he was in the war. In a flashback, Sandra and some show girls are performing for the military troops when a masked man appears on stage to kill the general. Edward goes on stage and discovers that this masked man is Red Fang, the infamous sniper. After a long battle on stage alongside the showgirls, he successfully kills Red Fang ("Red, White, and True"). Edward tells the boys that "some people say it was the turning point of the war." But when young Will asks which war, he is unable to answer. This adds to young Will's growing doubts of his father's stories. Later on, Edward tells Sandra and Will he has to travel for a while for his work as a traveling salesman. Will is upset, but Edward tells him he must be brave and Fight the Dragons ("Fight the Dragons").

In the present, Will nervously prepares to confront Edward about the deed he and Josephine found, as he has always been suspicious that Edward had been having an affair ("Stranger" (Reprise)). Edward is lying in bed when Will comes in and asks about the Ashton deed, but before he can address his suspicions, Edward grows angry and yells at him for wrongly accusing him of something. He yells at him to get out, and Sandra comes in to calm him down and get him to sleep. He falls into an uneasy sleep and has a dream that he and Will have a Western-style duel and trial over the issue with the outcome being a sentence of hanging for lying and having a house with Jenny ("The Showdown"). He wakes up screaming, and as Sandra calms him and comforts him, it begins to rain. Edward says the roof should hold up for another ten years after he's gone, and Sandra tells him she doesn't need a roof to feel at home as much as she loves him. He falls asleep in her arms as she begs, "Stay with me" ("I Don't Need a Roof").

Will, unable to get answers from Edward, goes to visit Jenny Hill in Ashton to find the truth. When he blatantly asks if she was having an affair with Edward, she says she's afraid that she will warp Will's view of his dad by telling him what happened. He says that his father "talks about things he never did," and that he "probably did things he never talked about," and he just wants to separate fact from story. Jenny tells him the story of what happened when Edward returned to Ashton when Will was just a small boy. In this a flashback, Edward returns to Ashton to learn that the town is going to be flooded, and he finds that the citizens and the mayor, Don Price, have chained themselves to the statue in the center of town out of protest. However, he learns they only have an hour before the flood covers the town and that no one with power even knows they are there. Despite Don's resentment of Edward, Don's brother Zacky and the people of Ashton convince Edward to take action with reluctant permission of Don. He visits Amos and Karl, who have both become rich and successful after being inspired by Edward. Using the land given from Amos and the money from Karl, he provides the citizens with a new town saying that Ashton isn't a place, it's a community. He convinces them all to move there instead of drown in the inevitable flood ("Start Over"). Everyone leaves except for Jenny, who explains her heartbreak when Edward never returned and how she has loved him all this time. Edward says that he's returned now and wants to start a new life with her. He buys a house for himself and Jenny that he has signed for, but he suddenly regrets his decisions and expresses his love for his wife saying he can only truly love her. He leaves Jenny with another broken heart, never to return again ("Start Over" (Reprise)). At the end of Jenny's story, Will receives a phone call and must go visit his father in the hospital.

When Will arrives to the hospital, he asks if Edward is going to be okay. Sandra and Josephine solemnly shake their heads 'no'. There is nothing left that can be done. Sandra and Josephine go downstairs to get him some water and leave Will alone with his unconscious father. When his doctor, a long-time friend of Edward's, comes in, Will asks how he would describe his father. He responds saying he was a strong man with a good heart. When asked if Edward can hear them, he responds, "It's hard to say whether or not someone can hear you. Harder still to know if they're listening." The doctor leaves leaving Will alone, once again, with his father. Will talks to him, saying that if you put all his stories together, they create a myth, and he finally understands the reason for his stories. He is interrupted by Edward stirring and urgently asking Will to tell him the story of how he dies. Will urgently explains that he does not know because he was never told the story. He asks how it starts, to which Edward responds, "like this." Will continues from there and makes up his own story of Edward escaping the "prison cell", realizing the reason he is sick is because he has been out of the water too long. They drive to the river where everyone from his stories is waiting for him as Will sings that Edward has finally finished telling his perfect tale ("What's Next"). At the river, Edward sings his love for all his memories and friends. When he notices that someone is missing, Sandra appears and they embrace one last time. They lead him back to his hospital bed as they disappear one by one, leaving Edward alone with Will. Edward's life has come to an end ("How It Ends").
 
The funeral takes place at the river's edge where it is apparent that Will is telling the same story that Edward told in the opening number. As the guests drop a flower and shake Will's hand one by one, he sees that each appears to be reflections of the characters from Edward's stories. Last in line, a tall man drops his flower and smiles at Edward's grave. Will shakes his hand and asks for his name. He simply responds, "I'm Karl". A few years later, Will and his son return to the river as he begins to tell him stories, just as Edward did to him ("Be the Hero" (Reprise)).

Productions
Directed and choreographed by Susan Stroman, Big Fish opened in an out-of-town tryout at Chicago's Oriental Theatre, running from April 2 to May 5, 2013. The cast featured Norbert Leo Butz as Edward Bloom, Kate Baldwin as Sandra Bloom, Bobby Steggert as Will Bloom, Krystal Joy Brown as Josephine, Brad Oscar as Amos Calloway, and Ryan Andes as Karl, with scenic design by Julian Crouch, costume design by William Ivey Long, lighting by Donald Holder, music direction by Mary-Mitchell Campbell, and orchestrations by Larry Hochman. The musical was produced by Dan Jinks and Bruce Cohen in association with Stage Entertainment.

Big Fish premiered on Broadway at the Neil Simon Theatre on September 5, 2013, in previews, and opened on October 6, 2013. The musical closed on December 29, 2013, after 34 previews and 98 regular performances.

The first regional production of Big Fish was presented by Jedlicka Performing Arts Center in Cicero, Illinois The production ran from July 29 through August 10, 2014. The second regional production was presented by Musical Theatre West at the Carpenter Performing Arts Center in Long Beach, California (October 31 - November 16, 2014). This first production "west of the Mississippi" used sets (partial), costumes, and multi-media from the original Broadway production, purchased by MTW after the show closed at the end of 2013, and was directed by Larry Carpenter, choreographed by Peggy Hickey, and conducted by Matthew Smedal. Jeff Skowron led the cast as Edward Bloom. The 12-chair (12-person cast) version of Big Fish, licensed by Theatrical Rights Worldwide, was presented by Front Porch Theatricals in Pittsburgh, Pennsylvania, for a sold-out seven-show run from August 18–27, 2017, at the New Hazlett Theater. This regional professional premiere starred Billy Hartung as Edward Bloom and Kristiann Menotiades as Sandra Bloom, and was directed by Spencer Whale, choreographed by Mara Newbery Greer, and music directed by Melissa Yanchak.

The European premiere took place in Munich's Prinzregententheater on November 10, 2016. Directed by Andreas Gergen and choreographed by Danny Costello, the show starred the undergraduates and graduates of the "August Everding" theatre academy. The Scottish premiere took place in Glasgow and was produced by Epilogue Theatre in partnership with the Village Storytelling Charity. It ran from January 17–19 and was directed by Luke Seawright and starred Pete Robson as Edward Bloom, Rachel Hunter as Sandra Bloom, and Michael Pellman as Will Bloom.

The Australian professional premiere opened at the Hayes Theatre on April 2, 2017, starring Phillip Lowe as Edward Bloom, Katrina Retallick as Sandra Bloom, and Adam Rennie as Will Bloom. The production was the 12 Chair version, produced by RPG Productions and directed by Tyran Parke.

The show received its London premiere in November 2017 at The Other Palace, starring Kelsey Grammer, Clare Burt (Sandra), Jamie Muscato, and Matthew Seadon-Young, with direction by Nigel Harman.

The show received its Scandinavian premiere at Uppsala Teater in Sweden on March 13, 2019. The Norwegian premiere will be at Sandvika Teater in October 2022.

Big Fish will receive its Belgian premiere in Bruges in September 2022. They will perform the West End version of the musical.

Musical numbers
Sources: PlaybillVault; Internet Broadway database

 Act I
 "Be the Hero" – Edward Bloom and Company
 Witch Sequence – The Witch, Edward Bloom and Company
 Ultrasound Sequence – Josephine Bloom
 "Stranger" – Will Bloom
 "Two Men In My Life" – Sandra Bloom
 "Ashton's Favorite Son" – Company
 "Out There on the Road" – Edward Bloom, Karl, Jenny Hill and Company
 "Little Lamb from Alabama" – Sandra Templeton and Alabama Lambs
 "Time Stops" – Edward Bloom and Sandra Templeton
 "Closer to Her" – Amos Calloway, Edward Bloom and Company
 "Daffodils" – Edward Bloom and Sandra Templeton (Bloom)

 Act II
 "Red, White and True" – Sandra Bloom, Edward Bloom and Company
 "Fight the Dragons" – Edward Bloom and Young Will Bloom
 "Stranger" (Reprise) – Will Bloom
 Showdown Sequence – Will Bloom, Edward Bloom and Company
 "I Don't Need a Roof" – Sandra Bloom
 "Start Over" – Edward Bloom, Don Price, Amos Calloway, Karl, Zacky Price and Company
 "Start Over" (Reprise) – Edward Bloom
 "What's Next" – Will Bloom, Edward Bloom and Company
 "How It Ends" – Edward Bloom
 "Be the Hero" (Reprise) – Will Bloom
Cut Songs

Two bonus tracks were added on the cast recording. These songs were initially in the show, but were later cut for various reasons.

 "This River Between Us" – Edward Bloom and Will Bloom
 "Magic in the Man" – Sandra Bloom

Cast and characters

Instrumentation
Big Fish was orchestrated by Larry Hochman, with additional orchestrations by Bruce Coughlin, for a fourteen-piece orchestra.  The instrumentation calls for two keyboards, two guitars, bass/bass guitar, drums, percussion, two woodwind players (Reed 1: piccolo, flute, alto flute, oboe, English horn, clarinet, soprano sax, alto sax, tenor sax; Reed 2: flute, clarinet, bass clarinet, tenor sax, baritone sax, bassoon), trumpet, French horn, violin, viola, and cello.  This orchestration was used on Broadway, conducted by Mary-Mitchell Campbell and will be licensed with the show.  Additional string players were added for the cast recording.

Awards and nominations

Critical response
Out-of-town reviews for Big Fish were positive. Variety called it "a wholly satisfying show: meaningful, emotional, tasteful, theatrically imaginative and engaging," and concluded:  [B]y taking Edward's tales as the jumping-off point for the theatricality of production numbers, the show makes a case for the musical form itself as a means of privileging imagination over ordinariness. The show does have a target audience after all, and it's those who love musicals.

Chris Jones of the Chicago Tribune wrote:  [I]n the best moments, you feel like you're watching something deep and powerful, sourced by a work of fine literature, propelled into awareness by a potent film and, most crucially of all, a story that makes us feel we can control, if not transcend, the story of the end of our lives.

Reviews were mixed once the show moved to Broadway. Upon seeing the show again after its move to New York, Jones commented on the changes:  This final Broadway version of "Big Fish" has changed considerably, and improved in leaps and bounds, from the version audiences saw in Chicago, especially in the radically different first act. . . . With the indefatigable, deeply engaged and seemingly irreplaceable Norbert Leo Butz driving its storytelling and willing the show's crucial emotional subtext into being by sheer force of talent and will, "Big Fish" arrives on Broadway as an earnest, family-friendly, heart-warming and mostly successful new American musical

Despite the quality production values, Joe Dziemianowicz of the New York Daily News felt that Susan Stroman's dances were pedestrian, writing: " 'Big Fish' is a singing version of catch-and-release. It hooks you, then loses you — all night."

Ben Brantley of The New York Times wrote:  Here, though, [Director Susan Stroman] seems to be drawing almost randomly from her bottomless bag of tricks. Yes, her use of dancers to embody an enchanted forest and a campfire is delightful. And it's hard not to chuckle when those two-stepping elephants make a cameo appearance. But if the show is all about the need for personal myths, it has to let its leading mythmaker take charge.

Elysa Gardner of USA Today agreed:  Somehow, though, the effect isn't as dazzling, or as moving, as you would hope -- particularly given the talented players involved in this production […] In the end, though, this Big Fish lacks the imagination or cohesion to reel you in like one of its hero's yarns.

Thom Geler of Entertainment Weekly had a more positive take on those same aspects:  It's no spoiler to say that imagination wins out, particularly in director-choreographer Susan Stroman's visually lavish production, which boasts dancing circus elephants, a mermaid who pops up from the orchestra pit, and tree trunks that ingeniously morph into a coven of witches. Don Holder's lighting, William Ivey Long's costumes, and Benjamin Pearcy's projections are often wondrous to behold . . . For the most part, though, Big Fish finds theatrically inventive ways to reel audiences into its central love story. In this case, it isn't boy-meets-girl but father-hooks-son. And Edward Bloom is quite a catch.

Michael Dale of BroadwayWorld.com praised its "clean humor:" 
Wholesomeness gets a bad rap on Broadway these days, usually regarded as the kind of unbearably sweet and inoffensive entertainment that sophisticated theatergoers must endure while taking their conservative grandmas out for a night on the town. […] But Big Fish, the new musical that tattoos its heart on its arm, displays no fear in plopping its unabashed wholesomeness right in your lap. Its spirit is steeped in Rodgers and Hammerstein decency that propels an evening that's adventurous, romantic and, yeah, kinda hip.

Butz's performance, however, has been almost universally praised. Jeremy Gerard of Bloomberg wrote:  The part is custom made for Norbert Leo Butz, who hasn't had such a meaty role since 'Dirty Rotten Scoundrels.' His ingratiating singing and dancing bespeak the rare man comfortable in his own skin, and he has that indefinable charismatic spark that defines a star.

Variety reviewer Marilyn Stasio wrote: "Norbert Leo Butz is cutting loose in another one of his don't-dare-miss-this perfs in 'Big Fish,' a show that speaks to anyone pining for a studiously heart-warming musical about the efforts of a dying man to justify a lifetime of lousy parenting to his alienated son."

References

External links
Big Fish at the Internet Broadway Database
Big Fish at Theatrical Rights Worldwide's website

2013 musicals
Broadway musicals
Musicals based on films
Musicals based on multiple works
Musicals based on novels
Plays set in Alabama
Plays set in the 20th century